Donald Atkinson may refer to:

 Donald R. Atkinson (1940–2008), American counseling psychologist
 Donald Atkinson (archaeologist) (1886–1963), British archaeologist who led work at Venta Icenorum
 Don Atkinson, Australian rules football captain and coach of Reservoir, winners of 1947 Northern Football Netball League
 Don Atkinson, Australian actor featuring in season one of Water Rats